Running Out of Time is a relay event used to promote discussion about climate change. It was the longest non-stop relay ever attempted with runners, cyclists and sailors working together to pass a baton hand-to-hand from COP26 in Glasgow to COP27 in Sharm El Sheikh. The baton moved non-stop through 18 countries: UK, France, Belgium, Netherlands, Germany, Austria, Italy, Slovenia, Croatia, Bosnia and Herzegovina, Montenegro, Albania, Greece, Cyprus, Israel and Egypt. The journey of  took forty days.

References

External links 

 

Relay races
Climate change
COP26
COP27